The Million Peso Money Drop is a Philippine game show which aired on TV5. It is based on the original UK series The Million Pound Drop Live. However, its set and theme music is adapted from the American version of the show. Unlike its UK counterpart, this version is pre-recorded and not broadcast live. The show is hosted by Vic Sotto.

The show premiered on October 14, 2012 and ended on February 17, 2013. It aired on Sundays, 8:30 pm (UTC+8).

Format

Gameplay
A pair with a pre-existing relationship is given ₱1 million, split into 40 bundles of ₱25,000 in ₱20 bills, at the beginning of the game. Contestants are presented with multiple-choice questions, typically either general knowledge or current events.

The contestants select one of the two categories presented at the beginning of each round. Each answer option is shown, which corresponds to a different trapdoor, known as a "drop". Among the presented options, only one answer is correct. The question is then revealed and the contestants are given a few seconds to discuss their answer. They are given 60 seconds to place all their money on the corresponding trapdoor of the answer they deem correct. However, if they are unsure of the correct answer, they may distribute their money among the drops as they see fit, but they must leave one drop clear without any money. Any bundles of money not placed on any drop at the end of 60 seconds are forfeited. The contestants may choose to stop the clock before the timer is up if they are satisfied with their choice of answers.

After the timer either runs out or is stopped, the host asks the contestants to "Step forward.", followed by the catchphrase, "Let's do the drop!". The drops for the incorrect answers are either opened altogether or one by one. Any money placed on these drops falls down the chute and is removed from the game by the security guards below the stage. Meanwhile, any money placed on the drop with the correct answer is carried over to the next question.

The process repeats until the contestants either run out of money and lose, or successfully answer the final question and win any remaining money.

The number of answers vary throughout the game as show below:

Quick Change
The contestants may use the "Quick Change" once during their entire game on any question except the eighth. This gives the contestants an additional 30 seconds to discuss and redistribute their cash among the trapdoors if needed. They may also distribute any money left unplaced on any trapdoor when the 60-second timer ran out.

See also
 List of programs broadcast by TV5

References

2012 Philippine television series debuts
2013 Philippine television series endings
TV5 (Philippine TV network) original programming
Philippine television series based on British television series
Television series by Endemol
Philippine game shows
Filipino-language television shows